Charles Dickerman Williams (October 1, 1900 – August 12, 1998) was an American lawyer who was known as a freedom of speech advocate.  In 1951, the president appointed him chief legal officer for the U.S. Commerce Department.

In 1922, Williams graduated from Yale University, and in 1924 from  Yale Law School. Williams served for a year as a clerk to Chief Justice William Howard Taft of the U.S. Supreme Court.

He was an Assistant United States Attorney in Manhattan fighting bootleggers as head of a prohibition enforcement unit in 1926.

In private practice with firm of Baker, Nelson & Williams he successfully argued in district court the case of Linus C. Pauling v. National Review, relying on the reasoning behind the case New York Times Co. v. Sullivan that public figures were unable to sue for libel except when there was actual malice.

In 1954, Williams joined the board of directors of the American Civil Liberties Union.

He appeared as chairman during the first few seasons of Firing Line, the television program moderated by William F. Buckley (founder of the National Review).

Williams died in Hamden, Connecticut, on August 12, 1998.  He was the father of Judge Stephen F. Williams.

See also 
 List of law clerks of the Supreme Court of the United States (Chief Justice)

References

Selected publications
 Williams, C. Dickerman (1955). "Problems of the Fifth Amendment," 24 Fordham L. Rev. 19
 Rouh Jr., Joseph L.;  and Williams, C. D. (1957). "Book Reviews," 105 U. Pa. L. Rev. 771
 Banco Nacional de Cuba v. Sabbatino (1963), Oyez.com

1900 births
1998 deaths
Law clerks of the Supreme Court of the United States
Yale Law School alumni
Assistant United States Attorneys
United States Free Speech Clause case law
First Amendment scholars
American Civil Liberties Union people